Jacob Edward MacDonald (born February 26, 1993) is an American professional ice hockey defenceman who is currently playing for the  San Jose Sharks of the National Hockey League (NHL).

Playing career
MacDonald grew up in Brighton, Michigan, where he played in Compuware's midget hockey program before progressing to junior hockey in the United States Hockey League with the Waterloo Black Hawks. He committed to and played collegiate hockey at Cornell University in the ECAC Hockey League. While developing his defensive awareness with Cornell, MacDonald struggled offensively at the collegiate level, registering just 21 points through 104 games in his four-year career.

As a free agent following his senior season with the Big Red in 2014–15, MacDonald made his professional debut in signing with the Elmira Jackals of the ECHL to end the regular season on March 26, 2015. In continuing with the Jackals in the 2015–16 season, MacDonald rediscovered his offensive touch in recording 17 goals and 37 points from the blueline to be selected to the ECHL's All-Rookie Team. He made his debut in the American Hockey League appearing in a one-game on loan with the Springfield Falcons.

In the 2016–17 season, MacDonald returned to the ECHL with the Toledo Walleye before signing an initial try-out contract with the Albany Devils, the New Jersey Devils farm team, on January 5, 2017. In making an early impression with Albany he soon secured an AHL deal for the remainder of the season and an extension after he scored eight goals and 24 points in 34 games to close out the year.

In his first full season in the AHL in 2017–18, MacDonald led the league's defensemen with 20 goals and 55 points and earned an AHL All-Star berth with the Binghamton Devils. Despite missing the post-season, he was selected to the AHL's First All-Star Team.

As a free agent, MacDonald opted to leave the Devils organization and sign his first NHL contract in agreeing to a two-year, two-way contract with the Florida Panthers on July 3, 2018. After attending the Panthers 2018 training camp, MacDonald impressed to make Florida's roster for the 2018–19 season. He made his NHL debut on opening night, and scored on just his third shift, and first career shot in a 2–1 shootout defeat to the Tampa Bay Lightning on October 6, 2018. After two games with the Panthers MacDonald was re-assigned to AHL affiliate, the Springfield Thunderbirds, for the remainder of the season. MacDonald assumed a top-pairing role with the Thunderbirds and in 72 games he led all blueliners in scoring with 14 goals and 43 points.

Following his first season in Florida, on June 29, 2019, MacDonald was traded by the Panthers to the Colorado Avalanche in exchange for Dominic Toninato.

MacDonald was suspended for two games on April 8, 2021, following a hit on Ryan Hartman.

In the  season, MacDonald began the season as a healthy scratch on the Avalanche opening roster. With the team suffering through a blight of injuries, MacDonald was inserted into the lineup in both defensive and forward roles through the first half of the season, registering just 2 assists through 33 games. On January 25, 2023, MacDonald was traded by the Avalanche alongside Martin Kaut to the San Jose Sharks in exchange for Matt Nieto and Ryan Merkley.

Career statistics

Awards and honors

References

External links

1993 births
Living people
Albany Devils players
American men's ice hockey defensemen
Binghamton Devils players
Colorado Avalanche players
Colorado Eagles players
Cornell Big Red men's ice hockey players
Elmira Jackals (ECHL) players
Florida Panthers players
Sportspeople from Portland, Oregon
Ice hockey people from Oregon
San Jose Sharks players
Springfield Falcons players
Toledo Walleye players
Undrafted National Hockey League players
Waterloo Black Hawks players